The Mount Allison Mounties are the varsity athletic teams that represent Mount Allison University in Sackville, New Brunswick, Canada.

The Mounties sports teams play their matches at Alumni Field which seats 2,500.

Athletics and recreations
The Mount Allison University Athletics & Recreation is led by Pierre Arsenault.  Arsenault came to Mount Allison from the New Brunswick Golf Association, where he served as executive director for seven years. Prior to this, Arsenault worked with Hockey Canada's Atlantic Centre of Excellence, the Saskatchewan Hockey Association, and with the University of Ottawa's Gee-Gees Varsity Hockey Team. He holds a Bachelor of Physical Education (concentration in sports administration) from the University of New Brunswick and a master's degree in sport administration from the University of Ottawa.

Varsity teams
Mount Allison Mounties teams compete in:
 Badminton (m/w)
 Basketball (m/w)
 Curling (w)
 Football (m)
 Ice Hockey (w)
 Soccer (m/w)
 Swimming (m/w)

Logo
In 1977, Garney Henley, a former Canadian Football League player with the Hamilton Tiger-Cats, became Athletics Director at Mount Allison and changed the logo from the "Double-Winged" A to the famous "Flying A" which remained the Mounties' logo until 2011. The Flying A became synonymous with Mounties athletics, and was arguably the most recognizable aspect of the department and the university.

In 2011, the university's administration undertook a re-branding initiative that would be campus-wide, stretching into the athletics department as well. Adopting a new, more modern look became the goal, and thus the current logo with an "A" adorned with a flame/torch was born. Taken from the university's crest, the flame, which also forms a stylized "A", along with the slanted font spelling "MOUNTIES" below the logo became the new look for the Mounties. Along with a new partnership with popular brand UnderArmour, it introduced the Mounties to the 21st century, and spearheaded by Athletics Director Pierre Arsenault became the one identity among all of the Mounties' varsity sports teams.

During the 2012 AUS Women's Hockey Playoffs, a new movement emerged on the Social Media website Twitter, when it is believed the phrase #MountiePride was first used in a popular fashion. Since then, the movement has leaped to new heights, and is now considered to be a part of this new identity, and a trademark of the Mounties teams.

Mounties football

The Mounties football program has been in operation since 1955. The team has made two appearances in the Vanier Cup, first in 1984, and then in 1991. The team has won six Jewett Trophy conference championships in their 14 appearances, most recently during the team's undefeated 2014 season. The program has also featured a Hec Crighton Trophy winner, Éric Lapointe, who won the award twice and was elected into the Canadian Football Hall of Fame based on his university career with the Mounties.

Athletes of the Year
This is an incomplete list

See also
 U Sports

References

External links 
 Home of the Mount Allison Mounties

U Sports teams
Sports teams in New Brunswick
Mount Allison University